The following is a list of events, births, and deaths in 1936 in Switzerland.

Incumbents
Federal Council:
Giuseppe Motta 
Hermann Obrecht
Philipp Etter
Johannes Baumann
Marcel Pilet-Golaz 
Albert Meyer (President)
Rudolf Minger

Tournaments
1935–36 Nationalliga
1936 Swiss Grand Prix
1936 UCI Road World Championships
1936-37 Nationalliga

Establishments
RSI Rete Uno, (Network One), a primary radio channel
August-World Jewish Congress

Events by Month

January

February

March

April

May

June

July

August

September

October

November

December

Other
The Postman from Longjumeau, an Austrian-Swiss comedy, is released

Births
Ingeborg Lüscher, German-Swiss painter
January 7-Claudio Polledri, fencer
January 26-Helmut Förnbacher, actor, film director and screenwriter
14 March – Bruno Oldani, designer (died 2021).
March 19-Ursula Andress, actor best known for her role as Honey Ryder in Dr. No
May 25-Ely Tacchella, footballer (association football) (d. 2017)
June 21-Janos Mohoss, fencer
July 19-Dieter Keller, chess master
November 18-Heinz Bäni, football midfielder (d. 2014)
October 7-Charles Dutoit, conductor
November 17-Frédy Girardet, chef
December 24-Léo Eichmann, football goalkeeper

Deaths
May 6-Hans Jelmoli, a composer and pianist

References

 
1936 in Swiss sport
1936 in Europe
Years of the 20th century in Switzerland